The Parque Urquiza (Urquiza Park) is a public urban park in Rosario, Argentina. It is located in the southeastern end of the city center, on top of the Paraná River ravines. It is bordered by 3 de Febrero St., the coastal Belgrano Avenue, Chacabuco St. and the beginning of Pellegrini Avenue. Its name is an homage to General Justo José de Urquiza, President of the Argentine Confederation from 1854 to 1860.

The park hosts an open-air stage (the Humberto de Nito Municipal Amphitheater, with a 3,000-people capacity), the Municipal Astronomic Complex (comprising the Luis Cándido Carballo Planetarium, the Víctor Capolongo Observatory, and the Experimental Science Museum), a large bas-relief called The Sower, a monument to General Urquiza, and the former Rosario station of the Ferrocarril Oeste Santafesino, as well as a fountain, a number of sculptures, sports fields and recreation areas.

References

 Parque Urquiza at the Municipality of Rosario website.
 Rosario Turística
 Recorriendo Rosario

Urquiza